Events from the year 2009 in Nepal.

Incumbents
President: Ram Baran Yadav 
Prime Minister: Prachanda (until 25 May), Madhav Kumar Nepal (starting 25 May) 
Vice President: Parmanand Jha
Chief Justice: Dilip Kumar Poudel (until 7 May), Min Bahadur Rayamajhi (starting 7 May)

Events

Deaths

 16 January - Indra Lohani.

References

 
21st century in Nepal
2000s in Nepal
Years of the 21st century in Nepal
Nepal